Park Jong-hwan ( born 9 February 1938) is a former South Korean football manager.

Managerial career 
Considered one of South Korea's greatest football managers in the 20th century, Park led South Korean under-20 team to the semi-finals in the 1983 FIFA World Youth Championship, and Ilhwa Chunma to three consecutive K League titles from 1993 to 1995. He left memorable results by showing various tactics under players' great teamwork. However, he was also criticised for his oppressive style and violence against players. He was nicknamed the "Bat Park" due to his violence.

Honours

Player 
South Korea U20
AFC Youth Championship: 1960

Manager
Seoul City
Korean Semi-professional League (Spring): 1978, 1980, 1988
Korean Semi-professional League (Autumn): 1985
Korean National Championship: 1980, 1982, 1986

South Korea U20
AFC Youth Championship: 1980, 1982

Ilhwa Chunma
K League 1: 1993, 1994, 1995
Korean League Cup: 1992
Asian Club Championship: 1995

Individual
Korean Semi-professional League (Spring) Best Manager: 1978, 1980
Korean National Championship Best Manager: 1980, 1982
K League 1 Manager of the Year: 1993, 1994, 1995
AFC Coach of the Year: 1995

References

External links 
 냉혹한 승부사, 박종환 감독 

1955 births
Living people
South Korean footballers
South Korea international footballers
South Korean football managers
Seongnam FC managers
South Korea national football team managers
Pohang Steelers players
Gimcheon Sangmu FC players
K League 1 players
Daegu FC managers
1996 AFC Asian Cup managers
Association footballers not categorized by position